David Bar-Rav-Hai (11 July 1894 – 15 July 1977) was an Israeli politician who served as a member of the Knesset for Mapai from 1949 until 1955, and again from 1956 until 1965.

Biography
Born David Borovoi in Nizhyn in the Russian Empire (today in Ukraine), Bar-Rav-Hai joined the Zionist Students Organization in Odessa. In 1911, he moved to Germany, but returned to Russia in 1918 and joined the Young Zion movement, becoming secretary of the Jewish community in Odessa, until the Soviet authorities closed it down in 1920. Afterwards he joined the Zionist underground, and was arrested in 1922. He was sentenced to two years in prison, but was released after 15 months and expelled from the country. In 1924, he made aliyah to Mandatory Palestine, where he joined Hapoel Hatzair. He became a member of the workers councils in Haifa and Jerusalem, and was sent to Poland and Romania as an emissary.

In 1933, he established a law office in Haifa. He was joined by his son, Meir, who studied law in the last class under the British Mandate. Between 1932 and 1948, Bar-Rav-Hai was a member of the Jewish National Council, after which he was an alternate member of the Provisional State Council.  As chairman of Israel's election committee in October 1948, he wrote that the need to hold elections within a short period of time made it impossible to create voting districts. Therefore, the whole country was one district for the purpose of the first elections for the Knesset, but with proportional representation. He argued in favor of delaying writing a formal constitution and drafting it "step by step...chapter by chapter," with the Israeli Declaration of Independence as its cornerstone.

In the elections of 1949, Bar-Rav-Hai won a seat on the Mapai list. He was re-elected in 1951, but lost his seat in the 1955 elections. However, he re-entered the Knesset on 24 October 1956 as a replacement for Senetta Yoseftal. He was re-elected in 1959 and 1961, serving until 1965. He was placed 115th place on the Alignment list in the 1965 elections.

References

External links

1894 births
1977 deaths
Jews from the Russian Empire
Israeli people of Ukrainian-Jewish descent
Jews in Mandatory Palestine
Mapai politicians
Members of the Assembly of Representatives (Mandatory Palestine)
Members of the 1st Knesset (1949–1951)
Members of the 2nd Knesset (1951–1955)
Members of the 3rd Knesset (1955–1959)
Members of the 4th Knesset (1959–1961)
Members of the 5th Knesset (1961–1965)
People from Nizhyn
People from Chernigov Governorate
Soviet emigrants to Mandatory Palestine
Soviet Jews
Ukrainian Jews